"Don't Give Up on Me Now" is a song by the American pop rock singer Ben Harper. It was released as a single on April 11, 2011 by the label Virgin.

The song was written by Ben Harper together with Jason Mozersky and released as the second single from the album Give Till It's Gone. It was only released in Italy.

Track list

Charts 

2011 singles
Ben Harper songs
2011 songs
Vertigo Records singles